Ludwig Cancer Research is an international community of scientists focused on cancer research, with the goal of preventing and controlling cancer. It encompasses the Ludwig Institute for Cancer Research, an international non-profit organization founded in 1971 by philanthropist Daniel K. Ludwig. The Institute is headquartered in New York City, with a European office located in Zurich. In addition, six Ludwig Centers were established at leading US cancer research institutions. Together, the Institute and Centers are known as Ludwig Cancer Research.

Since its founding in 1971, Ludwig Cancer Research has committed more than US$2.5 billion to cancer research. Ludwig Cancer Research focuses on both basic research and translational research, with specific emphasis on cell biology, genomics, immunology, neuroscience, prevention, cell signaling, stem cells, therapeutics, and tumor biology, as well as clinical trials and the design and development of small molecules with drug-like properties. Its researchers also focus on particular types of malignancy, including brain cancer, breast cancer, colon cancer, and melanoma.

Founder and history

Daniel K. Ludwig was a shipping magnate and real estate investor. Born in South Haven, Michigan in 1897, he used a $5,000 loan from his father to create a global business based on a fleet of supertankers. In the 1960s and 1970s, Ludwig was among the richest men in the world, owning approximately 200 companies.

He founded the Ludwig Institute for Cancer Research as an independent organization in 1971, the same year that the “War on Cancer,” declared by his friend President Richard Nixon, led to the establishment of the US National Cancer Institute. Ludwig believed that tackling the problem of cancer required the best minds operating in the most favorable conditions with the best resources to accomplish the task. This principle continues to guide Ludwig Cancer Research.

Daniel K. Ludwig endowed the Institute with all of the foreign assets from his business holdings. Upon his death in 1992, that endowment had grown to more than $700 million, and, as of 2012, it stands at more than $1.2 billion.

After Ludwig's death, his US-based assets were also put into a trust to support additional cancer research efforts. These funds led to the establishment of Ludwig Centers at six research institutions in 2006. The Ludwig Institute for Cancer Research and Ludwig Centers have been known collectively as Ludwig Cancer Research since 2012. In total, Ludwig Cancer Research has committed more than US$2.5 billion to cancer research worldwide since 1971.

Mission and goals

The primary objectives of Ludwig Cancer Research are to prevent and control cancer through basic and translational research.

Research

Immunotherapy

Lloyd Old, the organization's former director, and scientific chairman, participated in the discovery of Tumor Necrosis Factor (TNF) and the tumor suppressor p53. He contributed to the immunosurveillance hypothesis, from which modern cancer immunotherapy can be derived.

Thierry Boon, former director of the organization's Brussels branch, made foundational contributions to the field of cancer immunotherapy. The prevailing model of carcinogenesis in the late 1970s held that spontaneously arising tumors were unlikely to elicit immune responses. Boon and his team, who believed otherwise, were the first to isolate genes that code for a family of tumor antigens and show that T cells could recognize and target cancer cells bearing such antigens. This theory is being tested in a number of current clinical trials.

Ludwig researchers in Melbourne discovered and cloned the granulocyte-monocyte colony-stimulating factor (GM-CSF) through a collaboration with Australian immunologist Donald Metcalf. The factor is essential to the maturation of key white blood cells, and has been used extensively over the past few decades to help rebuild the immune system of patients undergoing chemotherapy. It is also being tested as a therapeutic agent in combination with several experimental immunotherapies for cancer. The Oncology Drug Advisory Committee of the US FDA recently recommended approval for T-VEC, a viral therapy for melanoma manufactured by Amgen that incorporates the gene for GM-CSF to support anti-cancer immune responses.

Ludwig researchers in São Paulo played a role in establishing that human papillomavirus (HPV) infection causes cervical cancer. They ran the largest epidemiological studies of HPV infection and reported that chronic, though not transient, infection by the virus dramatically increases the risk of cervical cancer, laying the groundwork for the clinical development of an HPV vaccine.

Current and former Ludwig researchers contributed to an emerging class of cancer immunotherapies known as checkpoint inhibitors. They explored the underlying immunology of the response and played a role in evaluating the first such drug in clinical trials for the treatment of advanced melanoma. This led the development of new criteria for evaluating responses of cancer patients to immunotherapy in clinical trials.

Cell signaling

Contributions to the field of cell signaling include the identification of signaling pathways and subsequent development of therapies. An example is the PI3K family of proteins, which play a key role in cell signaling that fuels cancer. This research led to the first Ludwig spin-off, a biotech named Piramed Ltd., which sought to develop cancer therapies based on this discovery. The company was purchased by the pharmaceutical company Roche. Drugs based on these discoveries are today being tested to treat several types of cancer, including breast and lung cancer.

Genomics

Contributions in the field of genomics include the work of Ludwig researchers at Johns Hopkins to sequence the full complement of genes expressed in many cancers, including head and neck, colon, and breast cancers, as well as glioblastoma multiforme (GBM). Ludwig researchers in San Diego significantly advanced studies of the epigenome, leading such efforts as the NIH's Roadmap Epigenomics Project.

Leadership

The Ludwig Cancer Research board of directors helps oversee both the Ludwig Institute for Cancer Research and the Ludwig Fund. Although each of these entities has its own board, the boards comprise the same individuals. The current chairman of the board is John L. Notter, an international financier and developer affiliated with a variety of companies, including Westlake Properties, Inc.

The executive staff manages the organization's worldwide efforts. Edward A. McDermott, Jr has been with the organization since 1988 and its CEO since 2010.

It was announced in December 2016 that Chi Van Dang will take over the role of Scientific Director in July 2017. He will be responsible for coordinating the organization's global research efforts and activities.

Notable faculty 

Notable awards received by past and present employees affiliated with Ludwig include:

National Medal of Science (US):
 Lucy Shapiro, 2011 Medal for Biological Sciences
 Robert Weinberg, 1997 Medal for Biological Sciences

Fellows of the National Academy of Sciences (US):
 Webster K. Cavenee
 Don W. Cleveland
 Richard Kolodner
 Thierry Boon
 Alexander Y. Rudensky
 Irving L. Weissman
 Bert Vogelstein
 Robert A. Weinberg
 Joan S. Brugge
 Lucy Shapiro

Academy of Medical Sciences (UK):
 Xin Lu
 Peter Ratcliffe

Locations

Branches and laboratories

  Brussels branch at the de Duve Institute of the UCLouvain Brussels Woluwe, University of Louvain
  Lausanne branch at the University of Lausanne
  New York collaborative laboratory at the Memorial Sloan Kettering Cancer Center
  Oxford branch at the Nuffield Department of Clinical Medicine of the University of Oxford
  San Diego branch at the University of California San Diego
  Sao Paulo laboratory group at the Molecular Oncology Center of the Hospital Sírio-Libanês
  Stockholm branch at the Karolinska Institute
  Uppsala branch at the Biomedical Center of the University of Uppsala

Ludwig Centers

 Baltimore: Ludwig Center at the Johns Hopkins University
 Boston: Ludwig Center at Harvard University Medical School
 Boston: Ludwig Center at the Massachusetts Institute of Technology
 Chicago: Ludwig Center at the University of Chicago
 New York City: Ludwig Center at the Memorial Sloan Kettering Cancer Center
 Palo Alto: Ludwig Center at Stanford University

Notes and references

External links 
 Ludwig Cancer Research website

Cancer organizations based in the United States
Medical research institutes in New York (state)
International research institutes